Machara is a village in the Gulripshi District of Abkhazia. On 30 May 2012, 37 repatriated members of the Abkhaz diaspora and their families received restored apartments in Machara.

Demographics
At the time of the 2011 census, Machara had a population of 2,640. Of these, 66.8% were Armenian, 23.7% Abkhaz, 6.5% Russian, 1.0% Georgian, 0.8% Greek and 0.3% Ukrainian.

See also
Machara Castle
 Gulripshi District

References

Populated places in Gulripshi District